Angan Ke Par Dwar is a 1961 poetry collection by Sachchidananda Vatsyayan, generally known by his pen-name, Agyeya. The book received the Sahitya Akademi Award in 1964.

Content
The poems of the book were written during the period 1959 to 1961.

The poems of the book is divided into three parts; Antah Salila, Chakrant Shila and Asadhya Vina (The Unmastered Lute). Antah Salila contains 18 poems. Chakrant Shila has 27 poems, majorly written with neo-mystical theme. The last part, Asadhya Vina, contains a long poem by the same title.

Agyeya heavily used Tadbhava words (words adopted from Sanskrit), avoiding Tatsama words (words borrowed from Sanskrit with modified phonology). Angan Ke Par Dwar played decisive role in bringing to the light the creative possibilities of the Tadbhava vocabulary.

Reception
Angan Ke Par Dwar received the Sahitya Akademi Award in 1964. It was translated into Gujarati by Bholabhai Patel as Anganani Par Dwar (2002). The critic Nand Kishore Acharya calls Asadhya Vina a 'culmination' of Agyeya's poetics and philosophy of life.

References

External links
 
 

Works by Agyeya
1961 poetry books
Hindi poetry collections
20th-century Indian books
Indian poetry collections
Sahitya Akademi Award-winning works